Reba: Duets is the twenty-sixth studio album by American country music singer Reba McEntire. It was released September 18, 2007,by MCA Nashville Records and September 24, 2007, by Humphead Records in the UK, and was produced by Tony Brown, Dann Huff, McEntire, and Justin Timberlake.

Reba: Duets was McEntire's second album to appear in the new millennium decade and one of her most successful crossover albums, as it is her first studio album to chart in Australia and her 3rd to chart in the UK. It was her first album to reach #1 on the Billboard 200, while also reaching #1 on the Top Country Albums chart, and was also her final release for the MCA Nashville label. The album featured collaborations from eleven different artists in the genres of country, pop, and rock.

The album debuted at #1 on the Billboard Top Country Albums chart and the Billboard Top 200 Albums chart with sales of 300,000.

Background
Reba: Duets was recorded at Starstruck Studios in Nashville, Tennessee. Allmusic reviewer, Thom Jurek considered that the quality of the album's tracks was different from that of most other collaboration projects, calling it a "mixed bag" of material. The first collaborator on the album was LeAnn Rimes, who recorded the track, "When You Love Someone Like That" which also appeared on LeAnn Rimes's Family album that same year. Jurek called the duet between the pair "stellar," while about.com called the pairing "an undeniable outcome of perfection. Reba's strong country voice with LeAnn's young, soulful sound created a new sound like no other."

The second track, "Does That Wind Still Blow In Oklahoma" was a collaboration with Ronnie Dunn (half of the duo Brooks & Dunn), who co-wrote the song with McEntire. The third track is a duet with Kelly Clarkson on one of her previous major pop hits, "Because of You." The song was the album's lead single and had already peaked at #2 on the Hot Country Songs chart at the time of the album's release. The song was criticized by allmusic, saying that, "the song is simply a big, overblown power ballad with guitars compressed to the breaking point, sweeping strings, and enormous crashing cymbals -- think Jim Steinman and you get it." The same idea was also said about the fourth track, "Faith In Love" with Rascal Flatts. The fifth track was performed with country artist, Trisha Yearwood on the song, "She Can't Save Him", which was formerly released as a single by Canadian country artist, Lisa Brokop. Tracks six and seven were collaborations with American pop artist, Carole King and country artist, Kenny Chesney, who both help in providing musical variations towards the album. Country Standard Time called track nine (a collaboration with Faith Hill called "Sleeping with the Telephone") "tearful emotion."

The tenth track was a duet with Justin Timberlake on the song, "The Only Promise That Remains", which was co-written by Timberlake himself. The song is performed in Celtic melody and Timberlake performs harmony on most of the song's length. The album closes with "Break Each Other's Hearts Again", a duet with Don Henley.

Critical reception

Reba: Duets gained fairly positive reviews from most music critics. Allmusic's Thom Jurek stated that although he considered it not to be a "perfect record", he did find the album to "deliver". Jurek concluded by saying, "It's sincere, it's polished, and it's full of good to great songs delivered in mostly interesting ways." In his review, he gave the album three and a half out of five stars.

Reviewing the album, Rick Bell of Country Standard Time gave praise to McEntire and her production on the release, saying, "Give credit to McEntire for corralling the egos - including her own - and producing an album with depth, passion and a bunch of great voices."  About.com'''s Scott Sexton gave Reba: Duets four and a half out of five stars, overall stating, "Reba McEntire has proven she can stand the test of time, and with some help from close friends she sounds better than ever." Reviewing Reba: Duets in 2007, Lana Cooper of PopMatters acclaimed McEntire's vocal strength in the album by saying, "Reba's voice manages to sound sweet without being syrupy, while being extremely powerful. McEntire's vocal strength yields a different kind of authority than the bluesy, drawling growl of Janis Joplin, the weathered rasp of Marianne Faithfull, or even the soul-shrieking powerhouse of Tina Turner. Instead, Reba's voice combines the aspects of all three singers but tempers it with a Southern sweetness and an unmistakable femininity." Cooper overall stated, "Reba Duets is largely a strong showing."

Release and aftermathReba: Duets was originally planned to be released in April 2007, however the date was pushed to September 18 instead. The lead single, "Because of You" was released to radio May 15 and reached a peak of #2 on the Hot Country Songs chart and #50 on the Billboard Hot 100 in August, shortly before the album's release date. A week after the album's release, it became the United States' best-selling album of the week, debuting at number one on both the Top Country Albums and Billboard 200 albums charts, selling a total of 300,536 copies in its first week, according to Nielsen SoundScan. It debuted at number 4 on the Canadian Album Charts. Reba Duets'' was certified platinum by the Recording Industry Association of America in October 2007, becoming her twentieth platinum album. The album's second single, "The Only Promise That Remains" (with Justin Timberlake) was released in November 2007, but only reached #72 on the Billboard Pop 100 and did not chart the Hot Country Songs list. The third single, "Every Other Weekend" (with Kenny Chesney) was released in 2008. However, the official single featured Skip Ewing as the duet partner instead of Chesney, due to the Chesney version not being "viable" for radio (due to radio company issues). It charted outside the main UK top 100 album chart but has sold over 15,000 copies in the UK. McEntire and LeAnn Rimes performed their duet of "When You Love Someone Like That" at the 41st CMA Music Awards.

Track listing

Personnel

Musicians 

 Reba McEntire – lead vocals
 Matt Rollings – Hammond B3 organ (1), acoustic piano (1, 6, 11)
  John Barlow Jarvis – acoustic piano (2-5, 9)
 Steve Nathan – Hammond B3 organ (2, 7, 8)
 Jimmy Nichols – synthesizer (3, 4, 5, 8), acoustic piano (7), Hammond B3 organ (9)
 Pete Wasner – acoustic piano (8)
 Michael Thompson – acoustic guitar (1), electric guitar (1)
 Tom Bukovac – electric guitar (1-10), acoustic guitar (10, 11)
 Ilya Toshinsky – acoustic guitar (2-5, 7-10)
 Dean Parks – acoustic guitar (6), electric guitar (11)
 Jay Dee Maness – steel guitar (1, 6, 11)
 Paul Franklin – steel guitar (2-5, 7, 8, 9)
 Rob Ickes – dobro (10)
 Aubrey Haynie – fiddle (2, 7, 10), mandolin (3, 4, 5, 8, 9, 10)
 Leland Sklar – bass guitar (1, 6, 11)
 Jimmie Lee Sloas – bass guitar (2, 7, 8, 9)
 Glenn Worf – bass guitar (3, 5), upright bass (10)
 Jay DeMarcus – bass guitar (4), backing vocals (4)
 Russ Kunkel – drums (1, 6, 11)
 Greg Morrow – drums (2, 7-9)
 Paul Leim – drums (3, 5)
 Chris McHugh – drums (4)
 Bergen White – string arrangements and conductor (3, 7)
 Carl Gorodetzky – string contractor (3, 7)
 The Nashville String Machine – strings (3, 7)
 Larry Gold – string arrangements and conductor (10)
 Caroline Buckman – strings (10)
 Alyssa Park – strings (10)
 Amy Wickman – strings (10)
 LeAnn Rimes – lead vocals (1)
 Ronnie Dunn – lead vocals (2)
 Curtis Wright – backing vocals (2)
 Jenifer Wrinkle – backing vocals (2)
 Kelly Clarkson – lead vocals (3)
 Gary LeVox – lead vocals (4)
 Joe Don Rooney – backing vocals (4)
 Trisha Yearwood – lead vocals (5)
 Carole King – lead vocals (6)
 Kenny Chesney – lead vocals (7)
 Vince Gill – lead vocals (8)
 Ashley Cleveland – backing vocals (8)
 Kim Keyes – backing vocals (8)
 Judson Spence – backing vocals (8)
 Faith Hill – lead vocals (9)
 Justin Timberlake – lead vocals (10)
 Matt Morris – backing vocals (10)
 Don Henley – lead vocals (11)

Production notes 

 Tony Brown – producer (1-9, 11)
 Reba McEntire – producer (1-9, 11)
 Dann Huff – producer (9)
 Justin Timberlake – producer (10)
 Mike Butler – recording (1)
 Derek Bason – additional recording (1, 2, 10), recording (2, 7, 8, 9), mixing (2, 7, 8)
 Nate Hertweck – recording assistant  (1)
 Todd Tidwell – additional recording (1, 2), recording assistant (1, 2, 7, 8, 9)
 Chuck Ainlay – recording (3, 4, 5, 10, mixing (3, 4, 9)
 Kyle Lehning – additional recording (3, 7, 11), mixing (11)
 Aaron Kasdoff – recording assistant (3, 4, 5, 10, 11), additional recording (5, 6, 11)
 Casey Wood – additional recording (3, 7, 11), recording assistant (3, 7, 11)
 David Bryant – additional recording,  (4, 5, 6, 9, 11), recording assistant ( (4, 5, 6, 9, 11)
 Ben Fowler – additional recording (4, 5, 6, 9, 11)
 Jeff Balding – additional recording (5, 6, 11)
 Al Schmitt – recording (6, 11)
 Steve Genewick – recording assistant (6, 11)
 Mark Hagen – additional recording (9)
 Seth Morton – additional recording (9), recording assistant (9)
 Kevin Mills – additional recording (10), recording assistant (10)
 Jeff Rothschild – additional recording (10)
 Steve Marcantonio – mixing (1, 6)
 J.C. Monterrosa – mix assistant (1, 6)
 Chris Ashburn – mix assistant (2, 7, 8), recording (8), additional recording (10), recording assistant (10)
 Jim Cooley – mix assistant (3, 4, 9)
 John Kelton – mixing (5)
 Matt Rovey – mix assistant (5)
 Jean-Marie Horvat – mixing (10)
 Colin Miller – mix assistant (10)
 Kazuri Arai – mix assistant (11)
 Tony Castle – digital editing
 Richard Davis – digital editing
 Brian David Willis – digital editing
 Adam Ayan – mastering
 Amy Garges – production assistant
 Craig Allen – art direction, design
 Marc Baptiste – photography
 Terry Gordon – stylist, wardrobe
 Brett Freedman – make-up, hairstylist
 Narvel Blackstock – management

Studios 
 Recorded at Starstruck Studios (Nashville, TN); Record Plant and Capitol Studios (Hollywood, CA).
 Additional recording at Starstruck Studios, Blackbird Studios, Cyber Ranch and Masterfonics (Nashville, TN); Henson Recording Studios (Hollywood, CA); Panhandle House (Denton, TX).
 Mixed at Starstruck Studios, Blackbird Studios, Sound Stage Studios and The Sound Station (Nashville, TN); The Sound Kitchen (Franklin, TN); Oz Recording Studios (Valencia, CA).
 Mastered at Gateway Mastering (Portland, ME).

Charts

Weekly charts

Year-end charts

Singles

Certifications

References

2007 albums
Reba McEntire albums
MCA Records albums
Vocal duet albums
Albums produced by Tony Brown (record producer)
Albums recorded at Capitol Studios